Cantigas is an orchestral composition by the Finnish composer Magnus Lindberg.  The work was commissioned by the Cleveland Orchestra and was composed between 1998 and early 1999.  Its world premiere was performed in Cleveland by the Cleveland Orchestra under the direction of Christoph von Dohnányi on April 1, 1999.

Composition
Cantigas is composed in a single movement and has a duration of roughly 19 minutes.

Instrumentation
The work is scored for a large orchestra consisting of three flutes (3rd doubling piccolo), two oboes, cor anglais, three clarinets (3rd doubling E-flat clarinet), bass clarinet (doubling contrabass clarinet), two bassoons, contrabassoon, four horns, four trumpets (4th doubling piccolo trumpet), three trombones, tuba timpani, three percussionists, harp, piano (doubling celesta), and strings.

Reception
Cantigas has been praised by music critics.  James R. Oestreich of The New York Times described the music as "glacially shifting blocks of harmony giving rise to explosions of strident color."  Keith Potter of The Independent wrote, "Cantigas was written in 1998-9 for the Cleveland Orchestra and lasts around 20 minutes. It is thus a recent example of Lindberg's considerable prowess as a purveyor of brightly coloured, brilliantly orchestrated scores, including a much higher percentage of genuinely fast music than composers tend to produce these days. It is also, however, a good example of its creator's move away from rhythm, gesture and sheer sonority as prime features to greater concern for harmonic thinking in the context of goal-directed structures."  Gramophone similarly observed:

Recording
A commercial recording of Cantigas, performed by the Philharmonia Orchestra under the direction of Esa-Pekka Salonen, was released through Sony Classical Records in 2002.  The album also features Lindberg's  Cello Concerto No. 1, Parada, and Fresco.

References

Compositions by Magnus Lindberg
1999 compositions
Compositions for symphony orchestra
Music commissioned by the Cleveland Orchestra